Thuemenella is a genus of fungi in the family Hypoxylaceae. The genus was circumscribed in 1898 by Albert Julius Otto Penzig and Pier Andrea Saccardo.

The genus name of Thuemenella is in honour of Felix von Thümen (1839–1892), who was a German botanist and mycologist.

Species
As accepted by Species Fungorum;
Thuemenella cubispora 
Thuemenella hirsuta 
Thuemenella javanica 

Former species;
 Thuemenella bicolor  = Sarawakus bicolor, Hypocreaceae
 Thuemenella britannica  = Trichoderma britannicum, Hypocreaceae 
 Thuemenella fragilis  = Trichoderma fragile, Hypocreaceae
 Thuemenella hexaspora  = Trichoderma hexasporum, Hypocreaceae
 Thuemenella izawae  = Trichoderma izawae, Hypocreaceae
 Thuemenella sordida  = Trichoderma sordidum, Hypocreaceae
 Thuemenella trachycarpa  = Trichoderma trachycarpum, Hypocreaceae

References

Ascomycota genera
Xylariales
Taxa named by Pier Andrea Saccardo
Taxa described in 1898